John J. Ray III (born January 1959) is an American attorney and CEO who specializes in recovering funds from failed corporations. He was appointed CEO of cryptocurrency exchange FTX in the aftermath of its November 2022 collapse. He previously served as chairman of Enron Creditors Recovery Corp., a company tasked with recovering creditor funds from Enron in the wake of its accounting scandal and subsequent collapse.

Early life and education
Ray grew up in Pittsfield, Massachusetts. He is the son of union plumber John J. Ray Jr. and his wife Florence. He graduated from the University of Massachusetts Amherst and Drake University.

Career
Ray started his career at Touche Ross, an accounting firm that later merged into Deloitte, before moving to the law firm Mayer Brown in 1984 and then to Waste Management. Soon after he was hired as general counsel of Fruit of the Loom in 1998, the clothing company posted massive losses and filed for Chapter 11 bankruptcy reorganization, with Ray managing the sale of the firm's assets. 

Having led one reorganization, Ray formed Avidity Partners LLC, a firm specializing in serving as a receiver, trustee and claims agent in insolvency proceedings. Clients included AbitibiBowater, National Century Financial Enterprises, Pac-West Telecomm He formed a new firm, Greylock Partners, providing similar services to Nortel, Residential Capital, Overseas Shipholding and others. In 2019 Greylock changed its name to Owl Hill Advisory. 

After Enron emerged from its Chapter 11 bankruptcy in 2004, Ray was appointed to chair the effort to recover assets for creditors through litigation against numerous banks. He served in that role through 2009. Under Ray’s leadership, the company returned $828.9 million to its creditors, which Ray said was nearly 52 cents on the dollar.  

Starting in 2010, Ray was the principal officer of the bankrupt Canadian telecommunications company Nortel.   

In 2014, Ray was appointed as an independent board member for GT Advanced Technologies.   

In 2016, Ray managed a trust which liquidated the assets of the major subprime mortgage services company Residential Capital.  

When cryptocurrency company FTX declared Chapter 11 bankruptcy on November 11, 2022, Ray was appointed to succeed Sam Bankman-Fried as the company's CEO. Six days later, in a filing with the United States Bankruptcy Court for the District of Delaware, Ray stated that in over 40 years of his experience in dealing with insolvencies, he had never encountered "such a complete failure of corporate controls and such a complete absence of trustworthy financial information as occurred here". In addition, he stated that FTX was managed by "a very small group of inexperienced, unsophisticated and potentially compromised individuals".

According to FTX's court disclosures, the company pays Ray $1,300 per hour and a $200,000 retainer fee.

References

Living people
Lawyers from Chicago
People from Pittsfield, Massachusetts
1959 births
Enron scandal
Bankruptcy in the United States
American chief executives of financial services companies
21st-century American lawyers
21st-century American businesspeople
Businesspeople from Chicago
University of Massachusetts Amherst alumni
Drake University alumni
People associated with cryptocurrency